The Kozan Dam is an embankment dam on the Kilgen River in Adana Province, Turkey. Constructed between 1967 and 1972, the development was backed by the Turkish State Hydraulic Works. The purpose of the dam is flood control and irrigation. It helps irrigate  of land.

See also
List of dams and reservoirs in Turkey

References

Dams in Adana Province
Dams completed in 1972